"Body" is a song by Canadian duo Loud Luxury featuring American singer Brando, released as a single on October 27, 2017, through Armada Music and All Around the World Productions. It was the duo's breakthrough hit and reached the top five in Canada, Denmark, Ireland and the UK, as well as the top 10 in Australia, Austria, Germany and New Zealand.

At the Juno Awards of 2019, the song won the Juno Award for Dance Recording of the Year, and was a shortlisted nominee for Single of the Year.

Background and composition
While attending a different act's showcase in Hollywood, Loud Luxury noticed Brando, who was part of the opening band. They emailed him and his manager, and eventually were presented with a hip hop demo Brando had been working on called "Body On My", which they called "silly" with a "DJ Mustard, strip-club anthem vibe". They still enjoyed Brando's vocals, so reworked the track, speeding it up and layering "emotional chords" underneath the vocal track. References in the lyrics to riding and dining in "the six" refer to a nickname for Toronto.

Performances
On March 17, 2019, Loud Luxury performed this song along with the Western University Marching Band as part of the Juno Awards opening.

Charts

Weekly charts

Year-end charts

Certifications

References

2017 singles
2017 songs
Loud Luxury songs
Brando (singer) songs
Juno Award for Dance Recording of the Year recordings
Songs about Canada
Songs written by Brando (singer)